Rojiște is a commune in Dolj County, Oltenia, Romania with a population of 1,600 people. It is composed of two villages, Rojiște and Tâmburești. These were part of Bratovoești Commune until 2004, when they were split off.

References

Communes in Dolj County
Localities in Oltenia